Hassan Bility (born 20 June 1969 in Yekepa, Nimba County) is a Liberian journalist, and the founder and Director of the Global Justice and Research Project (GJRP), a non-governmental organization dedicated to the documentation of war time atrocities in Liberia and to assisting victims in their pursuit of justice for these crimes.

During Liberia's civil wars, Bility was one of the country's most prominent journalists and human rights activists. While serving as Editor-in-Chief of the Analyst Newspaper under the regime of Charles Taylor, he was arrested multiple times. During the last of his arrests, he was accused of being an “unlawful combatant”, and was brutally tortured on Taylor's orders. He later testified in several trials, including the so-called ‘RUF trial’ of three former members of the Revolutionary United Front, as well as the trial of Charles Taylor, at the Special Court for Sierra Leone (SCSL); the trial of Charles McArthur Emmanuel, commonly known as Chuckie Taylor, in the USA; and the trial of Guus Kouwenhoven in the Netherlands.

Educational Background 
BA Degree in Mass Communication (minor in Political Science) University of Liberia (1998).

Career in brief

Journalism 
Bility worked as Managing Editor of the National Newspaper, Monrovia, Liberia (1997—2000). In 2000, he became Editor-in-Chief of the Analyst Newspaper and the Training Officer of the Press Union of Liberia. At the same time, he was engaged as Coordinator of the London-based International Alert peace-building program, through the Press Union of Liberia, and served as Press Officer of the European Union (EU) Liberian office in Monrovia under Ambassador Brian O’Neal.

For one year, Bility was a contracted writer with Amnesty International (2003-2004).  In 2004, he became Director of Communication at the International Institute for Justice and Development (IIJD), based in Boston, Massachusetts, USA. He toured the US speaking and raising awareness about the atrocities committed in Liberia.

Documentation work 
Since 2006, Bility has been working on the documentation of war-time crimes in Liberia in order assist in multiple investigations against alleged war criminals.

Global Justice and Research Project (GJRP) 
Bility founded the GJRP in 2012. Since then, under his leadership, the GJRP's documentation work has contributed to the investigation and arrest of multiple alleged Liberian war criminals throughout Europe and the US, including the arrests of:

●     Alieu Kosiah, a former commander of the ULIMO rebel group (2014, Switzerland);

●     Martina Johnson, a former commander of Charles Taylor's rebel group, the National Patriotic Front of Liberia (NFPL), for her implication in mutilations and mass killing committed in Liberia during the First Liberian Civil War (2014, Belgium);

●     Mohammed Jabbateh, a former commander of the ULIMO rebel group (2016, the USA);

●     Agnes Reeves Taylor, Charles Taylor’s ex-wife, for her suspected involvement with the NFPL during the First Liberian Civil War (2017, the UK);

●     Kunti K., a former commander of the ULIMO rebel group, for his alleged involvement in crimes against humanity committed during the First Liberian Civil War (2018, France); 

●     Thomas Woewiyu, co-founder and former spokesperson of the NPFL, and for several years Charles Taylor’s Defence Minister (2018, the USA);  Woewiyu’s sentencing hearing was postponed several times during 2018 and 2019. After the last postponement in April 2019, a new date for the hearing was not set, but was expected in 2020. Woewiyu was not in custody awaiting sentencing. On April 12, he died of COVID-19 after a week of treatment at the Bryn Mawr Hospital in Philadelphia, U.S.

●     Gibril Massaquoi, a former Revolutionary United Front (RUF) war lord of Sierra Leone, for war crimes and crimes against humanity allegedly committed in Liberia during the Second Liberian Civil War (2020, Finland)

Awards 
●     2002 – Press Union of Liberia, Best Journalist of the Year Award, Monrovia, Liberia

●     2003 – Amnesty International, International UK Media Award under the category ‘Human Rights Journalism under Threat’, London, UK

●     2003 – The Hassan Bility Courageous Journalism Award initiated by Liberians, USA

●     2004 – Freedom and Human Rights Courage Award, Philadelphia, PA, USA

●     2018 – Judith Lee Stronach Human Rights award for his courage, and his singular pursuit of justice for Liberia.

References 

Living people
Liberian journalists
1969 births